Haim "Kidoni" Bar-Lev (16 November 1924 – 7 May 1994) was a military officer during Israel's pre-state and early statehood eras and later a government minister.

Biography
Born Haim Brotzlewsky in Vienna and raised in Zagreb, Bar-Lev made aliyah to Mandate Palestine in 1939. From 1942 through 1948, Bar-Lev served in various Jewish military units, such as the Palmach. He became both a pilot and a parachutist, which would later serve him in developing both of these military branches in the young Israel Defense Forces.

In 1946 Bar-Lev blew up the Allenby Bridge near Jericho to prevent Arab militiamen in Trans-Jordan from entering Jewish towns west of the Jordan River. During the 1948 Arab–Israeli War, Bar-Lev was the commander of the Eighth Battalion (Mechanized) in the Negev Brigade, which fought in the southern part of the country and the Sinai.

During the 1956 Suez Crisis he commanded the 27th Armored Brigade, which captured the Gaza Strip before turning southwest and reaching the Suez Canal. By 1964 he became of Director of Operations within the Israel Defense Forces (IDF).

During the June 1967 Six-Day War he served as the Deputy Chief of Staff in the IDF. In late 1968 he accepted Maj. Gen. Adan's proposal that a high sand-dune wall be built along the east bank of the Suez Canal to prevent the Egyptian military from observing Israeli defenses along the Suez Canal. Behind the sand dune a line of fixed fortifications was constructed. This became known as the Bar Lev Line.

Between 1968 and 1971, Bar-Lev served as IDF's Chief of General Staff, which made him the highest-ranking military officer.

During the October 1973 Yom Kippur War, although retired from the IDF and serving as the Minister of Trade and Industry, he was recalled by Prime Minister Golda Meir back into military service to replace Shmuel "Gorodish" Gonen as chief of the Southern Command, which defended the Sinai Peninsula. Bar-Lev played a pivotal role in the war. Before his appointment the Southern front was in disarray to the point of near total collapse and Gonen was proving unable to effectively control the situation. Bar-Lev immediately took charge and worked towards stabilizing the front. His political and negotiating skills also proved instrumental in controlling his field generals who were feuding amongst themselves since each had their own notions, sometimes competing ones, regarding how the war in the South should be carried out. The effect that Bar-Lev's arrival had on the chaotic Southern command headquarters was described by Gonen's deputy, Uri Ben-Ari, in testimony to the Israeli military's historical department:

Bar-Lev brought calmness on all of us. Finally there was a feeling that we had a real commander in charge. This feeling spread between us and later also in the battlefield radios like fire. Bar-Lev also managed to calm Gorodish down. Prior to his arrival, general staff meetings were one loud shout out of Gorodish's mouth. Bar Lev instituted orderly working routines. No one challenged his authority. The country owes much to him. "Dvelah" went back to being a real war-room, a compartmentalized one. No one [who did not belong there] was allowed entry. Serenity descended on the war room. The general staff officers switched to carrying out their tasks in well organized shifts. Even Arik [Ariel Sharon]'s tone of voice changed when Bar Lev arrived.

Political career
Bar-Lev remained Minister of Trade and Industry until the Alignment government was defeated and replaced by the Likud under the leadership of Menachem Begin following the 1977 elections, in which Bar-Lev was elected to the Knesset for the first time. Between 1977 and 1984 he served as General Secretary of the Labor Party, the largest faction in the Alignment. When the Alignment joined the national unity governments that held office between 1984 and 1990, Bar-Lev served as Minister of Police and as a member of the "inner cabinet". He retired from the Knesset at the time of the 1992 elections, and was appointed ambassador to Russia, serving until 1994.

He died in Tel Aviv on 7 May 1994.

His son Omer Bar-Lev is an Israeli politician member of the Labor Party.

See also
 List of Israel's Chiefs of the General Staff

References

External links
 
  by Leon Charney on The Leon Charney Report

1924 births
1994 deaths
Jewish emigrants from Austria to Mandatory Palestine after the Anschluss
Palmach members
People of the Suez Crisis
Ambassadors of Israel to Russia
20th-century Israeli Jews
Deaths from cancer in Israel
Israeli Labor Party politicians
Alignment (Israel) politicians
Ministers of Development of Israel
Ministers of Public Security of Israel
Members of the 9th Knesset (1977–1981)
Members of the 10th Knesset (1981–1984)
Members of the 11th Knesset (1984–1988)
Members of the 12th Knesset (1988–1992)
Columbia University alumni